Mandagi is an Indonesian surname of the Minahasa people that originally comes from North Sulawesi. Notable people with the surname include:

Geri Mandagi (born 1988), Indonesian football goalkeeper
Marchelino Mandagi (born 1990), Indonesian football player

Indonesian-language surnames